The 1971 British Open Championship was held at the Edgbaston Priory Club in Birmingham from 4–12 December 1969. Jonah Barrington won his fourth title defeating Aftab Jawaid in the final.

Seeds

Draw and results

Main draw

Eighth Seed Abdelfattah Abou Taleb withdrew against Mike Hepker in the first round.

References

Men's British Open Squash Championships
Squash in England
Men's British Open Squash Championship
Men's British Open Squash Championship
Men's British Open Squash Championship, 1971
Sports competitions in Birmingham, West Midlands